Mykola Hordiychuk (born 5 February 1983) is a retired Ukrainian weightlifter. He competed in the men's heavyweight event at the 2004 Summer Olympics. He lifted in total 395.0 kg and originally finished 11th but his result was subsequently annulled. Later he served disqualification for doping abuse.

References

External links
 

1983 births
Living people
Ukrainian male weightlifters
Olympic weightlifters of Ukraine
Weightlifters at the 2004 Summer Olympics
People from Magnitogorsk
Doping cases in weightlifting
Ukrainian sportspeople in doping cases
Universiade silver medalists for Ukraine
Universiade medalists in weightlifting
Medalists at the 2011 Summer Universiade
21st-century Ukrainian people